The Pentax K-1 is the first production Pentax full-frame digital SLR camera. 
As the flagship model of the Pentax K-mount system, it includes several new and improved features, including a five-axis SR II in-body image stabilization system, newly designed flexible tilt articulating screen mounted on four metal struts allowing for rotation about the optical axis in addition to upward and downward tilt, and improved autofocus and metering systems.

History 

The camera was officially announced on February 5, 2016, launched on February 17, 2016 and first shipped on April 28, 2016.

Ricoh has continued to update the camera after release through free downloadable firmware updates. These have added features including, in v1.40, a night vision mode and a timer for bulb mode.

Limited Edition 
A Silver Limited Edition was announced on 24 August 2017, with 2000 units available worldwide.

K-1 II 
On 22 February 2018, Ricoh announced the Pentax K-1 Mark II with availability from the end of April 2018. Changes and improvements are the use of the newer imaging processing unit from the KP model as well as faster and more accurate autofocus.

Upgrade Service 
In 2018, Pentax offered an upgrade for owners of the K-1 which replaces the mainboard and includes the Image Processing Unit of the K-1 II.

Reception 

The K-1 achieved the German iF Design Award 2017 and Winner status in the German Design Award 2018.

References

External links 

 Pentax K-1 Special site, Ricoh Japan
K-1 product page, Ricoh Japan
K-1 product page, Ricoh Americas
K-1 product page, Ricoh Americas
K-1 II product page, Ricoh Europe
Pentax K-1 Limited Silver Edition, Ricoh Japan
A joy to use – PENTAX K1, Ricoh India
K-1 II Global product page, Ricoh Japan
Pentax K-1 Lens Compatibility Guide, PentaxForums.com
Pentax k-1 specification

Live-preview digital cameras
K-1
Cameras introduced in 2016
Pentax K-mount cameras
Full-frame DSLR cameras